Ganiyev or Ganiev (Cyrillic: Ганиев, Azerbaijani: Qəniyev) is an Asian masculine surname, its feminine counterpart is Ganiyeva or Ganieva. It may refer to 
Alisa Ganieva (born 1985), Russian novelist
Azizjon Ganiev (born 1998), Uzbek football midfielder 
Elyor Ganiyev (born 1960), Minister of Foreign Economic Affairs of Uzbekistan
Irek Ganiyev (born 1986), Russian football player
Luiza Ganieva (born 1995), Uzbekistani rhythmic gymnast
Ramil Ganiyev (born 1968), Uzbekistani decathlete 
Ziba Ganiyeva (1923–2010), Azerbaijani philologist and World War II sniper